Live in Scotland is a live album by Hank Williams III & the Damn Band. It was recorded at the Renfrew Ferry in Glasgow, Scotland on 20 June 2000.  It was released as an officially endorsed bootleg recording by Williams III in 2001 and has since gone out of print.

Track listing

Personnel
Hank Williams III - vocals, guitar
Jason Brown - upright bass
Michael "Fiddleboy" McCanless - fiddle
Shawn McWilliams - drums
Duane Denison - guitar

References

2001 live albums
Hank Williams III albums